Lycée polyvalent Pauline Roland is a senior high school/sixth-form college in the Nord/Ouest neighbourhood of Chevilly-Larue, Val-de-Marne, France, in the Paris metropolitan area. It is in proximity to the border with l'Haÿ-les-Roses. The school building has a capacity of 1,188 students.

History
46 years passed since initial attempts to open a lycée in Chevilly-Larue; the school finally opened on 5 September 2011.

The school was officially inaugurated on 19 November 2012.

References

External links
 Lycée polyvalent Pauline Roland 
 "Lycée Pauline Roland de Chevilly-Larue en grève le jeudi 4 avril. Communiqué.." SNES Créteil. 

Lycées in Val-de-Marne
2011 establishments in France
Educational institutions established in 2011